Juan Martín Cermeño, Zermeño (Ciudad Rodrigo, Salamanca, 1700 - Barcelona, 1773) was a Spanish architect, military engineer and lieutenant general.

Life and work 
Juan Martín Cermeño, son of Domingo Martín Báez and Isabel Fernández Cermeño was born in Ciudad Rodrigo. In 1719 he joined the Royal Engineers Corps. He reached the rank of field marshal in 1748, between 1749 and 1756 he had been an acting general commander of the military engineers.

From a young age he began collaborating in construction works. In 1721 Cermano reformed the entire exterior circuit of the Old Town Melilla. Cermeño also got married with Antonia de Paredes Fernández, in Melilla, and his son Pedro Martín Cermeño was born in the year 1722. In 1727 he participated in the siege of Gibraltar. In 1749, Cermeño was appointed General Commander of the Engineers. The Captain General of Catalonia, Jaime de Guzmán y Spinola, II Marquis of la Mina commissioned him to lay out a new neighborhood in Barcelona that would be called La Barceloneta , during that time the construction of the Citadel fortress was constructed in the Ribera neighborhood.

In 1755 he designed the Castle of San Pedro de la Roca del Morro , at the entrance to the bay of Santiago de Cuba. 

The Marqués de la Mina also entrusted Cermeño with the project of the refurbishing works of the Montjuïc Castle in Barcelona. The old fort was demolished and redone in 1779.

In 1751 Cermeño commissioned Pedro de Lucuce to make a report on how to defend the new frontier between Catalonia and France. In 4 September 1753, Cermeño initiated the works of the Sant Ferran Castle advised in Lucuce's report in Figueras. 

In 1758 he was appointed Governor of Oran and held the position until 1765. Nine years later his son Pedro Martín Cermeño, military engineer occupied the same position.

Cermeño was involved in city planning of Manila, and fortification of various places including Plaza de Cartagena, Castle of the Moors and planning the expansion of the defenses in Montevideo.

Reference

18th-century Spanish architects
1700 births
1773 deaths